Desert cockroach may refer to:

Arenivaga investigata, also known as a desert cockroach
Therea petiveriana, also referred to as a desert cockroach found in southern India

Animal common name disambiguation pages